National School of Administration or National School of Public Administration may refer to:
École nationale d'administration, Strasbourg, France
École nationale d'administration publique, Quebec City, Quebec, Canada
China National School of Administration, Beijing, China
National School of Public Administration (Greece), Athens, Greece
National School of Public Administration (Poland), Warsaw, Poland